Mary Phyllis Dwight (born December 3, 1951 in Kansas City, Missouri) is an American former handball player who competed in the 1984 Summer Olympics.

Early life
Mary Phyl Dwight attended Southwest Missouri State and was a multi-sport athlete. Dwight was on the softball, volleyball, basketball, track, and cross country teams.

Career

Handball
She was the captain of the US women's handball team, starting in 1974. In 1979 she started to play full time for the national team. Dwight played handball at the 1984 Summer Olympics.

Coaching

Kansas State
Dwight started her coaching career at Kansas State.

With the volleyball team she accrued a record of 108-88-4, coaching from 1975 to 1979.

The softball team finished 43-81.

University of Iowa
Mary Phyl Dwight was a volleyball coach for the University of Iowa Hawkeyes women's volleyball.

References

1951 births
Living people
Sportspeople from Kansas City, Missouri
American female handball players
Olympic handball players of the United States
Handball players at the 1984 Summer Olympics
Kansas State Wildcats women's volleyball coaches
Iowa Hawkeyes women's volleyball coaches